Canadian Airlines International Ltd. (stylized as Canadi›n Airlines or Canadi‹n Airlines, or simply Canadian) was a Canadian airline that operated from 1987 until 2001. The airline was Canada's second largest airline after Air Canada, carrying more than 11.9 million passengers to over 160 destinations in 17 countries on five continents at its height in 1996. Canadian Airlines served 105 destinations in Canada, more than any other airline. Canadian Airlines was also a founding member of the Oneworld airline alliance.

Canadian Airlines was headquartered in Calgary, Alberta, and had revenue of approximately $3 billion at the end of 1999. The airline and its aircraft were acquired by Air Canada in 2000, and the merger was officially completed on January 1, 2001.

History

Canadian Airlines International was the principal subsidiary of its parent company Canadian Airlines Corporation. The new airline was formed on March 27, 1987, when Pacific Western Airlines purchased Canadian Pacific Air Lines (which operated as CP Air for a number of years), which in turn had recently acquired Eastern Provincial Airways and Nordair.

In 1989, Canadian Airlines acquired Wardair, giving them access to new routes including long-sought-after routes to the UK and Europe. Its major hubs were at Montréal-Dorval International Airport (now known as Montréal-Pierre Elliott Trudeau International Airport), Toronto Pearson International Airport, Vancouver International Airport, and Calgary International Airport.

Canadian Airlines streamlined its operations and went through the financial restructuring of over $700 million in debt, after the 1991 airline industry slump. It was further aided by an injection of cash from the American Airlines Group.

On November 1, 1996, Kevin Benson, then president and CEO, unveiled a restructuring strategy to improve the profitability of Canadian Airlines International. The operational restructuring plan was supposed to be phased in over a four-year period, addressing the main issues of cost control, revenue growth, capitalization and fleet renewal. It was also one of the founding members of the Oneworld airline alliance, along with Qantas, American Airlines, British Airways and Cathay Pacific. The plan started off well but with the Asian economic downturn in 1998, air traffic decreased and Canadian suffered heavy losses on previously profitable trans-Pacific routes.

Canadian Plus was the largest frequent flyer program in Canada with more than 60 airline, hotel, car rental, and financial partners worldwide. The program had more than three million members.

In its last few years of operation, Canadian Airlines extended its international route network in Asia, with the most recent expansion of service to the Philippines, which gave it seven destinations in Asia. At that time Canadian Airlines had the distinction of flying to more places in Asia with more frequency than any other Canadian carrier.

Canadian Airlines' core business strategy focused on building its Vancouver hub into the leading gateway between North America and Asia. It leveraged its codesharing agreement with American Airlines in order to help capture a greater share of U.S.-Asia traffic flows.

Onex bid and Air Canada takeover

On August 20, 1999, Air Canada proposed a financial offer to Canadian Airlines which would see Canadian's International routes and airport slots sold to Air Canada for an undisclosed amount. Canadian Airlines would be relegated to be a regional carrier providing a feeder network to Air Canada. This offer was rejected. This financial offer evolved from a merger proposal between Canadian Airlines and Air Canada which had been ongoing since early 1999.

The proposed merger was backed by American Airlines, who had already owned a 25% stake in Canadian Airlines, the maximum allowed under Canadian foreign ownership restrictions. Then-American CEO Donald J. Carty, who had formerly headed Canadian predecessor Canadian Pacific Air Lines, planned to acquire a controlling interest in the enlarged Air Canada, with the purpose of moving it from the Star Alliance to Oneworld alliance. American Airlines was unsuccessfully lobbying Canadian federal government to ease foreign ownership restrictions on Canadian airlines. Afterwards, American sold its shares in Air Canada as the company decided to change its corporate strategy regarding the Canadian aviation market.

Four days later, on August 24, 1999, Onex Corporation announced a takeover bid for Canadian Airlines, backed by American Airlines's parent company AMR Corporation, consisting of $1.8B in cash and the assumption of $3.9B in debt. Canadian Airlines announced that it would support this and recommend acceptance from its shareholders. Air Canada rejected the offer. On August 31, 1999, Air Canada adopted a poison pill aimed at thwarting any takeover bid.

On October 19, 1999, Air Canada, backed by Star Alliance partners Lufthansa, United Airlines and CIBC announced a $930M counter bid to the Onex offer. Air Canada offered $92M for Canadian Airlines and committed to running it as a separate company. On November 2, Air Canada increased its offer to $16 per share to buy back 36.4 percent of the airline.

On November 5, 1999, a Quebec judge ruled that the Onex takeover was illegal, breaking the law that stipulates that no more than 10 percent of the company can be controlled by a single shareholder. Onex subsequently withdrew its offer and Air Canada stated it would proceed with the takeover of Canadian Airlines. 

On December 4, the board of directors at Canadian Airlines recommended the $92M merger offer from Air Canada to the shareholders. The offer from Air Canada originally expired at 5pm on December 7, 1999, but Air Canada extended their offer until December 23, 1999. Air Canada officially took control of Canadian Airlines, pending government approval, on December 8, 1999. The Federal Competition Bureau cleared the way for the takeover on December 21, 1999 and Canadian Airlines officially became a subsidiary of Air Canada on December 23, 1999.

Canadian Airlines operated as a subsidiary company through most of 2000. In October 2000, all of Canadian Airlines' systems and employees became fully integrated. With both companies fully integrated, Air Canada began massive cuts to employees starting with the announcement that there would be 3500 cuts in the workforce on December 22, 2000. September 26, 2001 saw an additional 5000 cuts primarily driven from the worldwide impact to the travel sector caused by the 9/11 attacks.

At the time of merger, Canadian Airlines carried over 40% of the domestic share of passengers in Canada. Following the completion of the acquisition, Air Canada controlled over 90% of the domestic share of passengers, and dominated international and US-Canada transborder traffic.

Internet presence
Canadian Airlines has the distinction of being the first airline in the world to have a website on the Internet (www.cdnair.ca). The website was launched in April 1994 and is recognized in the Canadian Internet Handbook 1994 and 1995 editions. It was given recognition for not only being the first airline website in the world but also the first with transactional capabilities such as flight arrival/departure and fare information. At the time, this fact was widely reported by Canadian media including CBC Venture and Maclean's Magazine. The website was created and credited to Grant Fengstad who at the time was leading a strategy to demonstrate that the Internet was going to revolutionize the travel sector.

Destinations 
This is a list of airports that Canadian Airlines International flew to during the 1980s and 1990s until its demise.

Asia

East Asia
 
 Beijing - Beijing Capital International Airport
 Shanghai - Shanghai Hongqiao International Airport
 
 Hong Kong International Airport (after 1998)
 Kai Tak Airport (terminated due to airport closure in 1998)
 
 Nagoya - Nagoya Komaki Airport
 Tokyo - Narita International Airport
 
 Taipei - Taoyuan International Airport

Southeast Asia
 
 Kuala Lumpur
 Kuala Lumpur International Airport
 Subang International Airport (before 1998)
 
 Manila - Ninoy Aquino International Airport
 
 Changi Airport
 
 Bangkok - Don Mueang International Airport

Europe

Eastern Europe
 
 Budapest - Budapest Ferenc Liszt International Airport
 
 Moscow - Sheremetyevo International Airport

Northern Europe
 
 Copenhagen - Copenhagen Airport
 
 London
 Gatwick Airport
 Heathrow Airport
 Manchester - Manchester Airport

Southern Europe
 
 Milan - Milan Malpensa Airport
 Rome - Leonardo da Vinci–Fiumicino Airport

Western Europe
 
 Paris - Charles de Gaulle Airport
 
 Frankfurt - Frankfurt Airport
 Munich
 Munich Airport
 Munich-Riem Airport (terminated due to airport closure)
 
 Amsterdam - Amsterdam Airport Schiphol
 
 Zürich - Zürich Airport

North America

Canada 
 Alberta
 Calgary - Calgary International Airport (hub)
 Edmonton
 Edmonton City Centre Airport (terminated due to airport closure)
 Edmonton International Airport
 Fort McMurray - Fort McMurray International Airport
 British Columbia
 Campbell River - Campbell River Airport
 Comox - Comox Airport
 Kamloops - Kamloops Airport
 Kelowna - Kelowna International Airport
 Nanaimo - Nanaimo Airport
 Penticton - Penticton Regional Airport
 Prince George - Prince George Airport
 Prince Rupert - Prince Rupert Airport
 Sandspit - Sandspit Airport
 Smithers - Smithers Airport
 Terrace - Northwest Regional Airport Terrace-Kitimat
 Vancouver - Vancouver International Airport (hub)
 Victoria - Victoria International Airport
 Manitoba
 Churchill - Churchill Airport
 Flin Flon - Flin Flon Airport
 Gillam - Gillam Airport
 The Pas - The Pas Airport
 Thompson - Thompson Airport
 Winnipeg - Winnipeg James Armstrong Richardson International Airport
 Newfoundland and Labrador
 Deer Lake - Deer Lake Regional Airport
 Gander - Gander International Airport
 Goose Bay - Goose Bay Airport
 Stephenville - Stephenville International Airport
 St. John's - St. John's International Airport
 Wabush - Wabush Airport
 New Brunswick
 Charlo - Charlo Airport
 Fredericton - Greater Fredericton Airport
 Moncton - Greater Moncton International Airport
 Saint John - Saint John Airport
 Northwest Territories
 Fort Smith - Fort Smith Airport
 Hay River - Hay River/Merlyn Carter Airport
 Inuvik - Inuvik (Mike Zubko) Airport
 Norman Wells - Norman Wells Airport
 Yellowknife - Yellowknife Airport
 Nova Scotia
 Halifax - Halifax Stanfield International Airport
 Sydney - JA Douglas McCurdy Sydney Airport
 Nunavut
 Cambridge Bay - Cambridge Bay Airport
 Iqaluit - Iqaluit Airport
 Nanisivik - Nanisivik Airport
 Rankin Inlet - Rankin Inlet Airport
 Resolute - Resolute Bay Airport
 Ontario
 Kingston - Kingston Norman Rogers Airport
 London - London International Airport
 Ottawa - Ottawa Macdonald–Cartier International Airport
 Sault Ste. Marie - Sault Ste. Marie Airport
 Sudbury - Sudbury Airport
 Sarnia - Sarnia Chris Hadfield Airport
 Thunder Bay - Thunder Bay International Airport
 Toronto - Toronto Pearson International Airport (hub) (Terminal 3)
 Windsor - Windsor Airport
 Quebec
 Bagotville - Bagotville Airport
 Baie-Comeau - Baie-Comeau Airport
 Kuujjuarapik - Kuujjuarapik Airport
 Kuujjuaq - Kuujjuaq Airport
 Montreal
 Montréal–Mirabel International Airport
 Montréal–Trudeau International Airport (hub)
 Radisson - La Grande Rivière Airport
 Sept-Îles - Sept-Îles Airport
 Val-d'Or - Val-d'Or Airport
Saskatchewan
 Regina - Regina International Airport
 Saskatoon - John G. Diefenbaker International Airport
 Prince Edward Island
 Charlottetown - Charlottetown Airport
 Yukon
 Whitehorse - Whitehorse International Airport

Mexico 
 Mexico City - Mexico City International Airport
 Monterrey - General Mariano Escobedo International Airport

United States 
 Boston - Boston Logan International Airport
 Chicago - O'Hare International Airport
 Dallas/Fort Worth - Dallas/Fort Worth International Airport
 Erie - Erie International Airport
 Fort Lauderdale - Fort Lauderdale-Hollywood International Airport
 Honolulu - Daniel K. Inouye International Airport
 Las Vegas - Harry Reid International Airport
 Los Angeles - Los Angeles International Airport
 Miami - Miami International Airport
 New York City
 John F. Kennedy International Airport
 LaGuardia Airport
 Orlando - Orlando International Airport
 San Diego - San Diego International Airport
 San Francisco - San Francisco International Airport
 Seattle/Tacoma - Seattle–Tacoma International Airport
 Washington, D.C. - Washington Dulles International Airport

Oceania
 
 Sydney - Sydney Airport
 
 Nadi - Nadi International Airport
 
 Auckland - Auckland Airport

South America 
 
 Buenos Aires - Ministro Pistarini International Airport
 
 Rio de Janeiro - Rio de Janeiro/Galeão International Airport
 São Paulo - São Paulo/Guarulhos International Airport
 
 Santiago - Comodoro Arturo Merino Benítez International Airport
 
 Lima - Jorge Chavez International Airport

Livery 

Upon its founding in 1987, Canadian Airlines revealed its new livery using the colours light grey, dark grey, navy blue, and red. The paint scheme was an adaptation of the recently introduced livery from predecessor Canadian Pacific Airlines. The lower half of the aircraft's body was navy blue, topped with light grey and red stripes, while the tail was blue, with approximately one third taken up by the carrier's new logo. The new Canadian Airlines logo was a combination of Canadian Pacific's five grey stripes, representing the five continents served by the carrier. Over these stripes was a thick, bright red chevron. The chevron was a simplification of the Pacific Western Airlines logo. The chevron was placed over the stripes, which then represented "Wings over 5 continents". It was also an ingenious and subtle way to represent the takeover of CP by PWA. The same logo, in a square form, became a clever alternative to a true bilingual name on the fuselage replacing the French "e", and the third "a" in English (Canadian/).

Canadian adopted a short-lived new livery in January 1999, less than a year before the airline was merged into Air Canada. The livery, known as "Proud Wings", featured a large Canada goose painted at the tail of the aircraft and the airline's name in a new Celeste font. This new font included a new chevron character, to again replace the French "e", and third "a" in English (Canadian/). The new livery, however, came so late that most of the fleet still retained the existing chevron livery by the time of the merger. Until the merger process with Air Canada was completed in 2001, most Canadian aircraft featured a transition livery with an Air Canada tail design while retaining the name "Canadian" on the sides.

Fleet 
When Canadian Airlines International was acquired by Air Canada in 2001, its fleet contained these aircraft:

Jet fleet 

Airbus A310-300 (from Wardair, five aircraft sold to Canadian Forces in 1992 and the rest sold to other airlines in the 1990s; replaced by Boeing 767-300ER)
Airbus A320-200
Boeing 737-200, 200-ELR and 200-Combi 
Boeing 737-300 (leased only by CP Air at the time of merger, returned to lessor in the late 1980s)
Boeing 767-300ER
Boeing 747-400
McDonnell Douglas DC-10-10 (Operated by CP Air. Leased from United Airlines, returned in 1987)
McDonnell Douglas DC-10-30
Fokker F28 Fellowship-1000 (operated by Canadian Regional Airlines)

Turboprop fleet 

Besides operating F28 jet aircraft, Canadian Regional Airlines also operated the following turboprop aircraft types on behalf of Canadian Airlines via a code sharing arrangement:

British Aerospace BAe Jetstream 31
de Havilland Canada DHC-8 Dash 8-100 and -300
Beechcraft 1900D
ATR-42
ATR-72

In-flight services
Canadian Airlines offered three classes:
 First Class (F)
 Business Class (J)
 Canadian Class (Y)
 referred to as Economy Class on turboprop aircraft

First Class was available on flights using wide body jets and Business Classes on flights not using regional jets or turboprop aircraft.

In 1987, Canadian Airlines banned smoking on all domestic flights.

Food
Food from flights within Canada were provided by LSG Sky Chefs and all other flights by local contractors.

Maintenance
Maintenance was provided by in-house operations during the existence of the airlines. Aircraft would be serviced by other airlines at airports without CA operations.

Ground handling
Ground handling was provided by in-house operations during the existence of the airlines. Aircraft baggage would be handled by in-house operations and the interior cleaning and lav and potable service, carpet replacement, seat back and seat covered replacement was handled by Canadian Airlines Cleaning department at airports within CA operations.

Entertainment
Most international and medium haul flights provided both video and audio entertainment. Short haul flights provided audio entertainment only.

Newspapers and magazines
Newspapers provided in-flight on most aircraft:
 Canadian – the official in-flight magazine of Canadian Airlines
 newspapers – The Globe and Mail, USA Today
 magazines – Maclean's

Lounges
Canadian lounges were called Empress Lounge and were located at several airports in Canada and abroad:
 Calgary International Airport, Calgary, Alberta
 Blatchford Field, Edmonton, Alberta
 Edmonton International Airport, Edmonton, Alberta
 Robert L. Stanfield Airport, Halifax, Nova Scotia
 Dorval Airport, Montréal, Quebec
 Mirabel Airport, Montréal, Quebec
 Macdonald-Cartier International Airport, Ottawa–Gatineau
 San Francisco International Airport, San Francisco, California, United States
 Toronto Pearson International Airport Terminal 3, Ontario
 Vancouver International Airport, British Columbia
 Ezeiza Airport, Buenos Aires, Argentina
 Benito Juárez International Airport, Mexico City, Mexico
 Galeão Airport, Rio de Janeiro, Brazil
 Guarulhos Airport, São Paulo, Brazil
 Don Muang Airport Terminal 2, Bangkok, Thailand
 Beijing Capital International Airport, Beijing, China
 Kai Tak Airport, British Hong Kong
 Chek Lap Kok Airport, Hong Kong
 Komaki Airport, Nagoya, Japan
 Taoyuan International Airport, Taipei, Taiwan
 Narita Airport, Tokyo, Japan
 Auckland Airport, Auckland, New Zealand
 Kingsford Smith Airport, Sydney, Australia
 Frankfurt Airport, Frankfurt, Germany
 Heathrow Airport, London, England, United Kingdom
 Malpensa Airport, Milan, Italy
 Charles de Gaulle Airport, Paris, France
 Leonardo da Vinci–Fiumicino Airport, Rome, Italy

Subsidiaries

Canadian Airlines' domestic network was broken down into five divisions:
 Canadian Partner served Ontario and Canadian Partner was Ontario Express.
 Canadian Regional Airlines, which served 69 destinations in British Columbia, Alberta, Saskatchewan, Manitoba, the Northwest Territories, Ontario, and the United States. Canadian Regional was 100 percent owned by Canadian Airlines.
 Calm Air which served 27 destinations in Manitoba, northwestern Ontario, and the Northwest Territories. Calm Air was 45 percent owned by Canadian Regional and continues to operate under separate management.
 Inter-Canadien served Ottawa, Toronto, Labrador, and 26 destinations throughout Quebec. Inter-Canadien was 100 percent owned by Canadian Regional.
 Air Atlantic, a regional partner of Canadian Airlines, served 16 destinations throughout the Atlantic provinces, Quebec, Ontario, and the United States.
 Canadian North was a division of Canadian Airlines created to serve the northern regions. Canadian North had a network of 10 destinations that expanded from its southern bases of Edmonton and Winnipeg. Canadian North also had a commercial agreement with Aklak Air, an Inuit-owned and operated airline in the Northwest Territories. Canadian North was sold in 1998 to Norterra and continues to operate as an independent airline.

In addition to flight providers, Canadian Airlines operated the largest tour operator in Canada called Canadian Holidays and the Canadian Getaways program. The operator flew to destinations which included destinations throughout North and South America. Their freight operation, Canadian Air Cargo, provided general air cargo services in Canada and the United States.

Media appearances
In 1994, the Canadian Children's show Mighty Machines filmed one of their episodes (Mighty Machines at the Airport) at Toronto Pearson International Airport, starring a couple of Canadian Airlines jets (a McDonnell Douglas DC-10, a Boeing 737-200 and an Airbus A320) and several other of the carrier's vehicles.

In the 1996 film, Homeward Bound 2: Lost in San Francisco the family is flying to Canada on Canadian Airlines when the pets escape. The pets then chase after the Canadian Airlines jet and sit on the runway as the Canadian 737 takes off over their heads. During this scene many other Canadian Airlines planes are visible. The scene, while supposed to be at San Francisco International Airport, was actually filmed at the Abbotsford International Airport in Abbotsford, British Columbia.

Accidents and incidents
No fatalities occurred on Canadian Airlines International flights. There were only two major incidents:
 On October 19, 1995, Canadian Airlines International Flight 17 rejected takeoff due to compressor stall and subsequently over-ran the end of the runway at Vancouver International Airport.
 On September 6, 1997, Canadian Airlines International Flight 30 aborted takeoff after experiencing an engine fire at Beijing Capital International Airport.

See also 
 List of defunct airlines of Canada

References

Further reading

External links

Official website archived at the Wayback Machine

Defunct airlines of Canada
Defunct companies of Alberta
Air Canada
Airlines established in 1987
Airlines disestablished in 2001
Former Oneworld members
1987 establishments in Alberta
2001 disestablishments in Alberta
Canadian companies established in 1987
Canadian companies disestablished in 2001